Yau Usman Idris is a Nigerian nuclear physicist and the current director general (CEO) of the Nigerian Nuclear Regulatory Authority (NNRA). He was appointed by Muhammadu Buhari, President of the Federal Republic of Nigeria.

Early life and education 
Idris was born in Kauru, Local Government Area of Kaduna State. He obtained his B.Sc in physics at the University of Maiduguri in 1988, M.Sc. in physics at the University of Ibadan in 1992, and PhD in nuclear physics at Ahmadu Bello University, Zaria in 1998.

He also obtained a certificate in BPTC - reactor safety, nuclear technology from Korea Institute of Nuclear Safety, South Korea in 2013. Another certificate was also obtained from Argonne National Laboratory, Chicago, Illinois in nuclear power plant development in 2009.

Career 
Idris worked in various places nationally and internationally in the field of nuclear and now is the director general of the Nigerian Nuclear Regulatory Authority (NNRA).

He was appointed as commissioner for Environment and Natural Resources by the Kaduna State Governor, Nasiru Ahmed El-rufai from August 2015 to February 2016.

He was then a lecturer researcher, Ahmadu Bello University, Zaria from 1999 to April 2004, and then lecturer researcher, Department of Physics, University of Maiduguri from 1989 to 1999.

Moreover, in the international responsibility of nuclear safety, he is a Vice Chairman of the Forum of Nuclear Regulatory Bodies in Africa (FNRA), African Regional Co-ordinator of the International Atomic Energy Agency (IAEA), Advisory Board Member of the African Nuclear Business Platform  (AFNBP), and Co-ordinator of the Website of the Forum of Nuclear Regulatory Bodies in Africa (FNRBA).

Award and membership 
He has received several awards such as international Leadership Gold Award for Excellent, Nigerian Self-service Gold Award (NISSGA) and Legends' Noble Award

Membership of professional association

He is the Secretary of the Forum of Nuclear Regulatory Body in Africa (FNRBA), Advisory Board Member for African Nuclear Business Platform ( AFNBP), Member Forum of Nuclear Regulatory Body in Africa (FNRBA), Nigerian Society for Radiation Protection (NSRP), Member Nigerian Institute of Physics (MNIP), and Member, Material Society of Nigeria (MMSN)

Personal life 
He is married with children.

See also 
 Heat energy
 Nuclear energy policy by country
 Nuclear reactor
 Nuclear weapon
 Radiation

References 

Year of birth missing (living people)
Living people
Ahmadu Bello University alumni
Nigerian physicists
Nuclear physicists
People from Kaduna State
University of Ibadan alumni
University of Maiduguri alumni